Hellboy is a fictional superhero created by writer-artist Mike Mignola. The character first appeared in San Diego Comic-Con Comics #2 (August 1993), and has since appeared in various eponymous miniseries, one-shots and intercompany crossovers. The character has been adapted into three live-action feature films. Two starring Ron Perlman in 2004 and 2008 in the title role, and one in 2019 which starred David Harbour, as well as two straight-to-DVD animated films, and three video games – Asylum Seeker, The Science of Evil, and as a playable character in Injustice 2.

A well-meaning half-Demon (or Cambion) whose true name is Anung Un Rama ("and upon his brow is set a crown of flame"), Hellboy was summoned from Hell to Earth as a baby by Nazi occultists (spawning his hatred for the Third Reich). He appeared in the ruins of an old church in East Bromwich in front of a team assembled by the Allied Forces; among them, Professor Trevor Bruttenholm, who formed the United States Bureau for Paranormal Research and Defense (B.P.R.D.). In time, Hellboy grew to be a large, muscular, red-skinned ape-like man with a tail, horns (which he files off, leaving behind circular stumps on his forehead that evoke the appearance of goggles), cloven hooves for feet (just regular feet in the movies where he always wears leather boots), and an oversized right hand made of stone (the "Right Hand of Doom"). He has been described as smelling of dry-roasted peanuts. Although a bit gruff, he shows none of the malevolence thought to be intrinsic to classical demons and has an ironic sense of humor. This is said to be because of his upbringing under Professor Bruttenholm, who raised him as a normal boy.

Hellboy works for the B.P.R.D., an international non-governmental agency, and for himself against dark forces including Nazis and witches, in a series of tales that have their roots in folklore, pulp magazines, vintage adventure, Lovecraftian horror and horror fiction. In earlier stories, he is identified as the "World's Greatest Paranormal Investigator". He also has been raising cats for the few years and saving terrified babies either from monsters or their moms. For example, when Hellboy saved his kittens from their mama.

Fictional character biography
Hellboy, or "Anung Un Rama" as he was called, was conceived on October 5, 1574, the day his birth-mother, Sarah Hughes, a human woman, was on her deathbed. In life, Sarah was a witch who gained her powers from being a consort of the archdemon, Azzael, an Archduke of Hell, and Hellboy's "biological" father. Taking Sarah's body to hell when she attempted to repent on her deathbed within a church in East Bromwich, England, Azzael burned her away so their child would be born, and chopped off the newborn's right hand to replace it with the "Right Hand of Doom", a relic tied to the Ogdru Jahad. When the other princes of Hell learned of his actions, Azzael sent his half-demon child away while he was stripped of his powers and imprisoned in ice (like Lucifer in Dante's Divine Comedy).

The child is eventually summoned to Earth in the final months of World War II by the "Mad Monk" Grigori Rasputin on Tarmagant Island, off the coast of Scotland, having been commissioned by the Nazis to change the tide of a losing war ("Project Ragna Rok"). As a direct result of this rite, the child appears on Earth in a fireball at what remains of the ruined Bromwich Church on December 23, 1944. Proving not to be a devil, in the traditional sense, but a devil-like creature, the child was dubbed "Hellboy" by Professor Trevor "Broom" Bruttenholm.

Taken by the United States Armed Forces to an Air Force base in New Mexico, Hellboy is raised by Professor Bruttenholm in as normal a home environment as possible (and as a Catholic), and the United States Army where he is introduced to the Bureau for Paranormal Research and Defense (BPRD), a private organization dedicated to combating occult threats. Due to the success of his first mission in 1952, Hellboy is granted "honorary human" status by the United Nations and becomes a member of the BPRD as the "world's greatest paranormal investigator". As such, Hellboy interacts regularly with humans, primarily law enforcement officials, the military, and various "scholars of the weird", most of whom are not presented as overtly reacting to his strange appearance.

As an adult, having matured physically within the years yet aging slowly mentally with a teenage mind, Hellboy becomes the primary agent for the BPRD, alongside other human and quasi-human agents that include Kate Corrigan, a professor of folklore at New York University; Abe Sapien, an amphibian humanoid (Ichthyo sapiens); and Liz Sherman, a young pyrokinetic. Things change dramatically for Hellboy during the events of Seed of Destruction when he searches for Professor Bruttenholm after he disappears during an expedition in the Arctic. He finds his adopted father only to witness his death at the hands of a Lovecraftian frog monster. The search takes Hellboy, Abe, and Liz to the Cavendish Hall mansion, which is a trap established by Rasputin to lure Hellboy into an embrace of his own "destiny", with the assistance of Sadu-Hem; one of the spawn of the Ogdru Jahad. Controlled by the spirit of one of the ancestral Cavendish men, Abe impales Rasputin. Liz's firestorm then incinerates Rasputin's body alongside Sadu-Hem's and destroys Cavendish Hall. Soon after, during a visit to Bromwich Church, Hellboy gets a glimpse of his conception 300+ years ago and learns he has two human half-siblings; a nun and a priest whose spirits haunt the church after their deaths, attempting to stop Azzael from claiming Sarah.

During the events of Hellboy: Wake the Devil, Hellboy's journey of self-discovery leads him to Romania to investigate the theft of an ancient box containing the corpse of Vladimir Giurescu, a Napoleonic officer who was, in fact, a vampire before he was "killed" on the order of a fearful Adolf Hitler. The culprit of the theft is revealed to be Ilsa Haupstein, one of the surviving members of Project Ragna Rok, who was revived from suspended animation and then aided in Giurescu's resurrection. Finding Castle Giurescu after splitting up with the other search groups, Hellboy learns that the source of Giurescu's rebirth is the ancient goddess Hecate. Though Hellboy destroys Hecate's original body, he faces her again after Rasputin unintentionally provides her with Ilsa's iron-maiden encased body. Hecate swallows Hellboy, but he returns to his own reality after he denounces the dark purpose he was born to perform.

Hellboy later learns that Liz is dying after losing her powers when she accidentally revived a homunculus while searching another location for Giurescu, finding Roger in the events of Hellboy: Almost Colossus as he convinces the homunculus to save Liz's life. Following the events of Hellboy: The Right Hand of Doom, gaining insight about his stone hand and being referenced as a harbinger of the Apocalypse, Hellboy is accompanied by Abe to hunt down the warlock Igor Bromhead in Box Full of Evil. But it turned out to be a trap conducted by Bromhead and the demon Ualac to capture Hellboy, using his True Name, Anung Un Rama, to restrain him, so that the latter can claim Hellboy's normally invisible Crown of the Apocalypse to increase their power. But this act, however, proves to be counter-productive, as it allows Hellboy to no longer be controlled by his true name, Anung Un Rama (as one of the translations of this name is, lit. "and upon his brow is set a crown of flame"; with the theft of his crown, the name is no longer accurate), and he kills Ualac's mortal body before the demon and the crown is taken to Hell by the archdemon, Astaroth, who is later revealed to be Hellboy's paternal uncle.

In the aftermath of Hellboy: Conqueror Worm, assisted by the ghost of Lobster Johnson, Roger, and Abe, a disillusioned Hellboy resigns from the Bureau before it later gains new agents in Johann Kraus, the spirit of a German medium kept in a containment suit; and Captain Ben Daimio, a special operations soldier that became an Olmec were-jaguar. From there, Hellboy decides to find out the truth of his existence once and for all. But, as revealed in Hellboy: Strange Places, Hellboy ends up being stranded on an island where he inadvertently resurrected an ancient mystic who gained knowledge of the secret history of the creation of Ogdru Jahad and the Right Hand of Doom.

6 years later, as Hellboy: Darkness Calls opens, Hellboy's search takes him to England where he finds himself in the middle of a power vacuum caused by Bromhead incapacitating Hecate in Italy. Refusing to serve the witches as their king, Hellboy ends up in the dimension of Baba Yaga, a witch whom he encountered in the past and happens to be an ally of Rasputin's. Managing to defeat Baba Yaga's champion Koshchei, Hellboy returns to his reality and is led to Bromhead after he became monstrous and in agony from his attempt to take Hecate's powers for his own. Hellboy gives Bromhead a merciful death before returning to England during the events of Hellboy: The Wild Hunt where he encounters Alice Monaghan, a young woman he saved as a baby from a fairy named Gruagach who has revived the lunatic sorceress Nimue to fill the void left by Hecate.

During that time, Hellboy encounters the spirit of Morgana le Fay who reveals to Hellboy both the names of his parents and that Sarah Hughes was her descendant, which names Hellboy as the last living heir to Arthur Pendragon and the rightful king of England. But as he also learns from Astaroth that he is destined to kill Satan and become the new King of Hell, Hellboy is reluctant to wield Excalibur (which in his hands becomes a flaming sword) and the army of undead British nobility amassed to face Nimue's army. Therefore, enlisting Baba Yaga's assistance with his eye as payment for the injury he did to her in their first meeting, Hellboy decides to face Nimue one-on-one in the events of Hellboy: The Storm and the Fury. But in the aftermath of his battle with Nimue, who was possessed by Ogdru Jahad at the time, Hellboy is killed by the witch in her final moments. As revealed in Hellboy in Hell, Hellboy ends up trapped in Hell, where he encounters what's left of his demonic kin and the souls of the damned, and ultimately comes to terms with the destiny he has been shrugging off his whole life. Hellboy later returns in the mini-series BPRD: The Devil You Know, revived and joining Liz and Abe in the final arc of the series. After defeating Rasputin again, he and Hecate see the fall of the Ogdru Jahad and get back the Right Hand of Doom from the Osiris Club, killing them. Despite their efforts, however, Ragnarok is fulfilled and most of humanity is destroyed.  In the end, Hellboy and Hecate fuse together to create a new world on Earth.

Powers and abilities
Afforded by his demonic heritage as well as extensive physical training and bodybuilding, Hellboy possesses superhuman strength that exceeds the 1-ton base limit, endurance, a degree of resistance to injury, and a healing factor that allows him to heal quickly from virtually all bodily injuries as well as renders him immune to all diseases. He also has the innate ability to comprehend ancient and magical languages. The extent of his strength is unclear, but he has torn down a large tree and hurled it at an opponent and has lifted massive stones. He has also picked up and thrown opponents weighing at least four to five hundred pounds. Hellboy has a high degree of resilience to injury. He can withstand powerful blows that would severely injure or kill a human. He survived being shot many times in the chest with an MG 42 machine gun before destroying it. He has survived being impaled through the chest with a sword, severe werewolf mauling, being beaten unconscious with heavy iron tongs, falling from extreme heights, being crushed by boulders, and more. In the film version, it is stated that Hellboy is immune to all forms of fire and burns, including Liz Sherman's flames, and electrocution. Despite his ability to quickly recover from seemingly mortal wounds, he is far from invulnerable and can be injured or bloodied by conventional weapons. Curiously in certain instances, the spilling of Hellboy's blood causes lilies to sprout - a supernatural indicator of his true good nature. This unique property comes into play even at the culmination of Ragnarok, where Hecate spills Hellboy's blood onto the incinerated Earth to breathe life back into it. It is revealed to Baba Yaga by the dead Russian nobility that Hellboy may not be slain even through supernatural means and that he appears to be as deathless as her warrior, Koschei the Deathless. In the films, Hellboy has shown skill in necromancy, animating a man's dead body so that it could give him directions. This also happened in the 2019 reboot, where Hellboy is able to raise an entire army of the dead after embracing his power as Anung Un Rama.

Hellboy ages quite differently from human beings. In the story Pancakes he is now two-years old but appears to be somewhere between 6 and 10 in human years old. In Nature of the Beast, set in 1954, the ten-year-old Hellboy appears fully grown. His rapid physical maturation is in contrast to his actual rate of aging, however, which seems to be much slower than humans. Throughout the sixty-year span of time depicted in the comics, he does not age beyond the plateau of physical maturity. This mystical aging process is similar to the other demons and supernatural beings that populate Hellboy's world. The lifespan of a demon or half-demon as Hellboy's mother was human, is left undefined within the comics and seems to range from decades to many thousands of years. In the movies, Hellboy's aging process is described by BRPD as "reverse dog years".

In addition to his natural physical abilities, Hellboy carries a variety of items in his utility belt and jacket that can be used against various supernatural forces. He has been known to carry holy relics, horseshoes, various herbs, and hand grenades. Though he commonly carries an oversized revolver, which in the Guillermo del Toro films was named the "Good Samaritan", and which was forged from the recycled iron from a church bell; Hellboy freely admits, however, to being a lousy shot with it, and often favors fighting hand-to-hand, preferring to use short-ranged physical weapons like swords, spears, and his massive stone fist over firearms. Hellboy's lack of formal combat training and education is compensated for by his decades of experience as a paranormal investigator, though encounters with unfamiliar threats have often forced him to resort to improvisation and using his wits.

Right Hand of Doom
As revealed in Strange Places, Hellboy's right hand was originally the right hand of Anum, one of the Watcher angels that watched over the burgeoning Earth and created the Ogdru Jahad. After sealing the Ogdru Jahad away, Anum was destroyed by his fellow spirits. Only his right hand remained intact as it was kept and preserved by the Hyperboreans, the first race of man. The Right Hand of Doom eventually ended up in the possession of Azzael before he grafted it onto the newborn Hellboy.

As the hand which created and bound the Ogdru Jahad, it is also the key that will "loose and command" them; in other words, it is a catalyst that will bring about Ragnarok. The comic books themselves never mention how the Right Hand of Doom would actually perform these tasks; they only explain this is the case and someone or something intends to do it, with or without Hellboy's consent. The film shows it working as a key: being turned twice in a special obelisk secured by Rasputin would release the Ogdru Jahad. Astaroth and others also told of how the Hand contains the power to awaken the great Army of Hell, an army powerful enough to shatter the boundaries between Heaven, Hell and Earth for the wielder to rule all of Creation. This prophecy had never come to pass thanks to Hellboy's consistent refusal to embrace his destiny. It is made clear it is not necessary for the arm to be attached to Hellboy to perform its duties. It has been suggested if Hellboy dies while the Hand is attached to him, it would become useless. He has, therefore, concluded the only way to prevent its falling into the wrong hands is to keep and protect it.

Concept and creation
Hellboy originated in 1991 with a drawing Mike Mignola did for a Great Salt Lake Comic-Con promotional pamphlet of a demon with the name "Hell Boy" written on his belt. Mignola had initially no intention of doing anything serious with the concept, but eventually decided he liked the name.

Later, Mignola became interested in doing a creator-owned comic, as he felt it made more sense to create his own characters for the stories he wanted to tell, rather than trying to shoehorn existing characters into these stories. Mignola elaborated, "The kinds of stories I wanted to do I had in mind before I created Hellboy. It's not like I created Hellboy and said, 'Hey, now what does this guy do?' I knew the kinds of stories I wanted to do, but just needed a main guy." He initially created Hellboy as part of a team of five, but scrapped this idea when he realized he could not think of any team names that he liked.

Much like other American comic book superheroes, such as Batman, Wolverine, Iron Man, Daredevil, and Spawn, Hellboy is constantly tormented by the knowledge of his past. One example being in Wake the Devil where he describes his mindset since the aftermath of Seed of Destruction by saying, "I like not knowing. I've gotten by for fifty-two years without knowing. I sleep good not knowing."

Publication history

Before Hellboy was published independently at Dark Horse Comics, the concept was initially pitched to a board of directors for DC Comics, who loved it, but did not like the idea of it involving "Hell".

The early stories were conceived and drawn by Mignola with a script written by John Byrne and some later stories have been crafted by creators other than Mignola, including Christopher Golden, Guy Davis, Ryan Sook, and Duncan Fegredo. The increasing commitments from the Hellboy franchise meant that 2008 one-shot In the Chapel of Moloch was the first Hellboy comic Mignola had provided the script and art for since The Island in 2005.

Issues
Hellboy has an internal numbering on the inside cover of its issues. Below are the stories listed by their internal numbering for the comics.

Issues: Hellboy in Hell
Hellboy in Hell is a finished series with its own numbering.

Issues: Hellboy and the B.P.R.D.
Hellboy and the B.P.R.D. is an ongoing series of miniseries.

Original Graphic Novels: Hellboy
Special stories were created for hardcover original graphic novels.

One Shots
 Hellboy Winter Special (2016) 
 Hellboy Winter Special 2017 
 Hellboy Winter Special 2018 
 Hellboy Winter Special (2019) 
 Hellboy – Krampusnacht 
 Hellboy vs. Lobster Johnson – The Ring of Death

Trade Paperbacks: Hellboy
All in-continuity Hellboy comics are collected in trade paperbacks.

Trade Paperbacks: Hellboy in Hell
All Hellboy in Hell comics are collected in trade paperbacks.

Trade Paperbacks: Hellboy and the B.P.R.D.
All Hellboy and the B.P.R.D. comics are collected in trade paperbacks.

Library editions
These editions collect the stories in the size they were originally drawn.

Omnibus editions
These editions collect the complete Hellboy series in chronological order.

Other trade paperbacks
 Hellboy: Weird Tales, Volume 1 (February 2003) – Cover by Mike Mignola. Collects Hellboy: Weird Tales #1–4. .
 Hellboy: Weird Tales, Volume 2 (October 2004) – Cover by Mike Mignola. Collects Hellboy: Weird Tales #5–8. .
 Hellboy Junior (January 2004) – Written by Mike Mignola, Bill Wray, et al. Collects Hellboy Junior Halloween Special, Hellboy Junior #1–2, plus original material. .
 Ghost/Hellboy Special (June 1997) – Written by Mike Mignola. Collects Ghost/Hellboy #1–2. .
 Savage Dragon/Hellboy (2002) – Cover by Mike Mignola. Collects Savage Dragon #34–35.
 The Art of Hellboy (March 2003) – Written by Mike Mignola. Dark Horse Books. .
 Hellboy: The Companion (May 2008) – Written by Steve Weiner, Jason Hall. Dark Horse Books. .
 Hellboy: Masks and Monsters (October 2010) – Written by Mike Mignola, James Robinson, Scott Benefiel, Jasen Rodriguez. Collects Batman/Hellboy/Starman #1–2, Ghost/Hellboy #1–2. Dark Horse Books. .

Other appearances
Beyond the Hellboy comic and its associated spinoffs, Hellboy has made appearances in other publications:

Great Salt Lake Comic-Con pamphlet
The character name "Hell Boy" was included in a drawing by Mike Mignola of a demon character in a black and white illustration, with the later recognized name appearing on the demon's belt buckle. This image, accompanied by a short biography of Mike Mignola and his latest creation, appeared in the pamphlet in 1991. It is the first published mention of the later recognized name. This image was reprinted in The Art of Hellboy. This image was also used to create the “First Hellboy” statue by Mondo Tees, in both black and white and full color.

Dime Press
A prototype incarnation of Hellboy appeared on the cover of Dime Press #4 (Glamour International Production, 1993), an obscure Italian fanzine, with "Hellboy©Mignola 93" written at the bottom of the cover. The cover, illustrated by Mignola and by the Italian artist Nicola Mari, shows Hellboy in the act of attacking a "diabolic" version of the Italian SF comic book character Nathan Never (with bat wings and pointed tail). Mari at the time was one of the artists that worked on Nathan Never, and the first two years of the life of this comic were the main topic of the fanzine. With the exception of the cover, there is no other mention of Hellboy within the fanzine. The character shown was still in a draft stage, and although close to the final design of Hellboy, it had gray skin and an outfit not common to the character.

San Diego Comic-Con Comics
Mike Mignola's Hellboy by Mike Mignola and John Byrne featured the character's first full appearance, and was a four-page black-and-white story that had an approximately 1,500 book print run. It was published by Dark Horse Comics in San Diego Comic-Con Comics #2 (August 1993) for distribution at the San Diego Comic-Con convention held in San Diego, California. It was also reprinted in The Comic's Buyers Guide #1069, along with an interview with creator Mike Mignola.

Hellboy travels to an American ghost town, where he encounters a mangy mutt that transforms into Anubis, the Ancient Egyptian god of mummification.

The story was collected in the trade paperback Hellboy: Seed of Destruction.

Next Men
Hellboy makes a guest appearance in John Byrne's Next Men #21; this is the first American appearance in a full-color cameo.

Comics Buyer's Guide
Mike Mignola's Hellboy: World's Greatest Paranormal Investigator by Mike Mignola and John Byrne featured the character's next solo appearance. It was published by Dark Horse Comics in a special four-page mini-comic for distribution in Comics Buyer's Guide #1,070 (May 20, 1994).

In the story Hellboy battles with the disembodied head of Nazi scientist Herman von Klempt and his puppet henchman Brutus the Gorilla to rescue a captive girl from the doctor's transference of nutrient fluids process.

The story was collected in the trade paperback Hellboy: Seed of Destruction.

Celebrate Diversity
Hi, My Name is Hellboy by Mike Mignola was a one-page panel ad that related the character's fictional origins. It was published by Diamond Comic Distributors in catalog supplement Celebrate Diversity collector's edition (October 1994). The ad was collected in the trade paperback The Art of Hellboy.

Hellboy: The First 20 Years was published on 1 April 2014.

In other media

Live-action films

Hellboy (2004)

The film was directed and co-written by Guillermo del Toro and starred Ron Perlman as Hellboy (the favorite of both del Toro and Mignola for the role), Selma Blair as Liz Sherman, Rupert Evans as FBI Special Agent John Myers (a character created for the film), John Hurt as Professor Trevor Bruttenholm, Doug Jones as Abe Sapien (voiced by an uncredited David Hyde Pierce), Karel Roden as Grigori Rasputin, and Jeffrey Tambor as FBI Senior Special Agent Tom Manning. The film depicts Hellboy as living at the BPRD with a dozen cats and limited access to the outside world, and considered an urban legend by the general populace.

Hellboy II: The Golden Army (2008)

A sequel, Hellboy II: The Golden Army, was shot in Budapest by Guillermo del Toro and released in 2008, with Perlman and Blair returning. Jones also returned as Abe Sapien (undubbed this time), and also in two other roles: The Angel of Death and The Chamberlain. Revolution Studios had planned on making the film (which Columbia Pictures was to distribute), but the studio went out of business before filming. Universal Studios then picked it up. The plot is a shift to more folklore rather than action, with heavy European overtones. The character of Johann Kraus was added to the team, voiced by Seth MacFarlane. The character Roger the Homunculus was not, but he was written into the plot as a very prominent character in early drafts of the script. The character of Agent Myers from the first film does not return, his absence being explained by Liz remarking that Hellboy had him transferred to Antarctica out of jealousy. Hellboy also reveals himself to the outside world in this film, and Liz is revealed to be pregnant with his children, twins. On November 11, 2008, Hellboy II: The Golden Army was released on DVD.

Cancelled third film

A sequel for Hellboy II: The Golden Army was in development in 2009, entitled Hellboy III: Dark Worlds. Guillermo del Toro was slated to return as the film's director and writer. Ron Perlman, Doug Jones, Seth MacFarlane, Selma Blair and Jeffrey Tambor were set to reprise their roles. In the sequel, Hellboy would live his normal life as a father for his two newborn twins with Liz Sherman, but also has to face an extremely powerful enemy who wishes to rule and bring the darkness upon Earth. In 2017, it was announced that the sequel was canceled due to the difficulty of funding the film, and a reboot would happen instead.

However, in July 2019, Perlman said that he would still love to finish the trilogy with del Toro, ignoring the reboot and that he thought it could happen if financing could be found.

Hellboy (2019)

In May 2017, a reboot, titled Hellboy: Rise of the Blood Queen, was announced by Hellboy creator Mike Mignola, revealing that the project was to be directed by Neil Marshall and star David Harbour as the titular character. Mignola also stated that the film would have an R rating unlike previous installments. In August 2017, Ian McShane was cast as Trevor Bruttenholm. Mila Jovovich was cast as Nimue the Blood Queen. On August 10, 2017, the Hellboy reboot dropped the Rise of the Blood Queen title and is simply titled Hellboy. On August 16, 2017, Sasha Lane was cast as Alice Monaghan. On August 21, 2017, Ed Skrein was cast as Major Ben Daimio, however, upon discovering that Daimio was portrayed in the comic books as a Japanese-American character, Skrein pulled out to allow an Asian actor to be cast instead. The film takes inspiration from Darkness Calls, The Wild Hunt, The Storm and the Fury, and Hellboy in Mexico. Hellboy was released on April 12, 2019.

Hellboy: The Crooked Man (TBA)
In February 2023, Millennium Media announced plans for a new live-action reboot titled Hellboy: The Crooked Man, the first in a potential series of films. Production is scheduled to begin in March 2023 in Bulgaria with Brian Taylor directing from a script by Mignola and Christopher Golden, based on the 2008 comic of the same name. The film is to be co-produced between Nu Boyana and Campbell Grobman Film and is presented by Millennium Media in association with Dark Horse Entertainment. Taylor expressed his intentions to "reset" the film series and depict a younger and wandering version of Hellboy with a folk horror influence similar to the comics; Taylor also confirmed that the film would be R-rated in order to embrace the "dark and scary and violent and adult" elements of the comics. The following month, Jack Kesy was announced to portray Hellboy, and Jefferson White and Adeline Rudolph were cast as Tom Ferrell and Bobbie Jo Song.

Animated films

On November 9, 2005, IDT Entertainment issued a press release announcing that the company had licensed the rights to develop "animated content for television and home entertainment" based on the Hellboy comic. Ron Perlman (Hellboy), Selma Blair (Liz Sherman), Doug Jones (Abe Sapien) and John Hurt (Professor Trevor "Broom" Bruttenholm) have all voiced their respective characters. Actress Peri Gilpin joined the cast as Professor Kate Corrigan.

The first two 75-minute animated movies, Sword of Storms and Blood and Iron, were aired on Cartoon Network before being released on DVD. The first one aired on October 28, 2006, and the second aired on March 17, 2007.

Both stories have much more in common with the comic book Hellboy rather than the film — Abe Sapien is not psychic, for example, and the artwork and color palette is derived more from Mignola's original artwork. The DVD of Sword of Storms was released on February 6, 2007; it contains documentary material, commentary, and a Hellboy comic, "Phantom Limbs". Blood and Iron similarly contains a comic called "The Yearning".

After the initial release, some stores included exclusive giveaways with copies of the Hellboy Animated: Blood and Iron DVD:
 Best Buy: A 7" Hellboy figure
 Walmart: An 80-page digest titled The Judgment Bell
 Transworld: A 64-page Hellboy Digest
 Infinity: A Lobster Johnson magnet
 Circuit City – A Hellboy "Bust-Up"

A "Hellboy 2 Pak" limited edition DVD set was released July 1, 2008, that contained both films and a 7" figure.

A third animated Hellboy film, The Phantom Claw, has been put on hold. Tad Stones, director and writer of the direct-to-video movies, says the film will star Lobster Johnson and will have some familiar characters, but Abe and Liz will not be in the film (at least not as main characters).

In 2021, Iranian short animation, Hellboy: Frozen is in development and tells a new story with a new villain named Amacus in Morocco.

Novels and anthologies
Christopher Golden has written several novels about the character, the first two of which, The Lost Army and The Bones of Giants, are part of the official Hellboy story canon. The events of both these novels are listed in the comic's official timeline featured in Hellboy: The Companion. In particular, the Golden-penned character of Anastasia Bransfield was also described in the companion, despite having never actually appeared in a comic.

 Hellboy: The Lost Army (written by Christopher Golden, cover and other illustrations by Mike Mignola, 1997)
 Hellboy: Odd Jobs (by editor Christopher Golden, writers include Stephen R. Bissette, Greg Rucka, Nancy A. Collins, and Poppy Z. Brite; with an introduction by Mike Mignola. Milwaukie: Dark Horse Comics, Inc., December 1999)
 Hellboy: The Bones of Giants (written by Christopher Golden, cover and other illustrations by Mike Mignola, 2001)
 Hellboy: Odder Jobs (by editor Christopher Golden, writers include Frank Darabont, Guillermo del Toro, Charles de Lint, Graham Joyce, Sharyn McCrumb, James Cambias, and Richard Dean Starr, October 2004)
 Hellboy: On Earth As It Is In Hell (written by Brian Hodge, cover by Mike Mignola, September 2005)
 Hellboy: Unnatural Selection (written by Tim Lebbon, cover by Mike Mignola, March 2006)
 Hellboy: The God Machine (written by Thomas E. Sniegoski, cover by Mike Mignola, July 2006)
 Hellboy: The Dragon Pool (written by Christopher Golden, cover by Mike Mignola, March 2007)
 Hellboy: Emerald Hell (written by Tom Piccirilli, cover by Mike Mignola, February 2008)
 Hellboy: The All-Seeing Eye (written by Mark Morris, cover by Mike Mignola, October 2008)
 Hellboy: Oddest Jobs (by editor Christopher Golden, writers include Joe R. Lansdale, China Miéville, Barbara Hambly, Ken Bruen, Amber Benson, and Tad Williams, July 2008)
 Hellboy: The Fire Wolves (written by Tim Lebbon, cover by Mike Mignola, April 2009)
 Hellboy: The Ice Wolves (written by Mark Chadbourn, cover by Duncan Fegredo, September 2009)
 Hellboy: An Assortment of Horrors (2017)

Video games
A Hellboy video game called Hellboy: Dogs of the Night, developed by Cryo Interactive, was released in 2000 for Microsoft Windows. It was ported to PlayStation as Hellboy: Asylum Seeker with David Gasman voicing Hellboy.

On April 6, 2005, Hellboy movie director Guillermo del Toro announced on his official site that he had made a deal with the developer Konami to create a new Hellboy video game based on the movie version of the character and his world, featuring new monsters, new villains, and a new storyline. Herman von Klempt and his war ape Kriegaffe #10 were slated to make appearances. On May 9, 2006, it was revealed that the Hellboy game would appear in the summer of 2007, on PlayStation 3, Xbox 360, and PlayStation Portable. The game was released in North America on June 24, 2008 with the name Hellboy: The Science of Evil with Ron Perlman reprising his role. It is developed by Krome Studios, and published by Konami Digital Entertainment, Inc. As well as single-player campaign where the player gets to play as Hellboy the game also features co-op play, featuring the characters Abe Sapien and Liz Sherman. Two additional levels and Lobster Johnson as a playable character (voiced by Bruce Campbell) as DLC were developed but were unreleased.

A Hellboy video game called Hellboy II: The Golden Army – Tooth Fairy Terror was released for the iPhone by Tuesday Creative on January 14, 2009.

Hellboy is a playable DLC character in Injustice 2, voiced by Bruce Barker, as part of the "Fighter Pack 2". The character was released for download on Tuesday, November 14, 2017. He is brought to the Injustice universe by Brainiac who decides to add him to his collection as he is fascinated by Hellboy's human-like mind and personality despite being a demon. In his ending, Hellboy escapes from Brainiac's collection and defeats him. As a result, he is asked to assist in rounding up local supervillains before eventually returning to the B.P.R.D. but finds his work there unfulfilling and ends up retiring to Africa.

Hellboy appeared as a playable character in Brawlhalla.

A Hellboy roguelike video game, titled Hellboy: Web of Wyrd, is currently in the works by developer Upstream Arcade. It is scheduled for a release on Microsoft Windows, Nintendo Switch, PlayStation 4, PlayStation 5, Xbox One, and Xbox Series X/S. Lance Reddick voices the title character and it was one of his final productions prior to his death.

Tabletop games
In 2002, Hellboy Sourcebook and Roleplaying Game was published by Steve Jackson Games using their GURPS role-playing system, in both softcover and hardback.

Mantic Games released a Hellboy: The Board Game in 2019, after a successful crowdfunding campaign.

In 2020, Mantic Games followed up the boardgame with another Hellboy Kickstarter campaign, this time for a new Hellboy roleplaying game, using D&D 5E as a base for the game rules. The roleplaying game is aiming for a March 2021 release.

Awards
The miniseries Hellboy: Conqueror Worm won a 2002 Eisner Award for "Best Limited Series", while The Art of Hellboy won an Eisner in 2004 for "Best Comics-Related Book". Mignola won a 2000 Harvey Award for "Best Artist", based on Hellboy: Box Full of Evil. Hellboy: Darkness Calls won a 2007 Eagle Award for "Favourite Colour Comicbook – American".

The character Hellboy was nominated for "Favourite Comics Character" at the 2004 and 2005 Eagle Awards. Other Eagle Award nominations include "Favourite Comics Story published during 2007" for Hellboy: Darkness Calls, and "Favourite Comics Hero".

The comics writer Alan Moore listed Hellboy on his recommendations page, particularly Wake the Devil (Vol. 2), calling it "the skillful cutting and the setting of the stone that we can see Mignola's sharp contemporary sensibilities at work".

In March 2009, Hellboy won two categories in the fan voted Project Fanboy Awards for 2008: "Best Indy Hero" and "Best Indy Character".

In 2011, Hellboy was ranked 25th of the Top 100 Comic Book Heroes by IGN.

Merchandise
On May 22, 2017, Dark Horse Comics, XXX Distillery LLC, and Prestige Imports LLC officially released Hellboy Hell Water Cinnamon Whiskey, a small batch, naturally-flavored whiskey.

See also
 The Amazing Screw-On Head, another comic book from Dark Horse written and drawn by Mike Mignola.

References

 
 
 Mignola on Hellboy's Extended Universe. Comic Book Resources. March 3, 2008.
 NYCC: Hellboy Dominates 2008

External links
 
 Hellboy Zone. Dark Horse Comics.
 Hellboy at Don Markstein's Toonopedia. 
 
 Hellboy videogame at the Konami website

 
1994 comics debuts
British superheroes
Characters created by Mike Mignola
Comics characters introduced in 1993
Comics characters with accelerated healing
Comics characters with superhuman strength
Cthulhu Mythos comics
Dark Horse Comics adapted into films
Dark Horse Comics adapted into video games
Dark Horse Comics superheroes
Embracer Group franchises
Fantasy comics
Fictional British people
Fictional characters with superhuman durability or invulnerability
Fictional demons and devils
Fictional demon hunters
Fictional gunfighters in comics
Fictional half-demons
Fictional occult and psychic detectives
Fictional paranormal investigators
Fictional secret agents and spies in comics
Fictional swordfighters in comics
Fighting game characters
Hellboy characters
Horror comics
Occult detective fiction
Science fantasy comics
Science fiction film characters
Superheroes who are adopted
Vigilante characters in comics